In the United States Senate election in Wisconsin in 1968, incumbent Democrat Gaylord A. Nelson defeated Republican Jerris Leonard

Major candidates

Democratic
Gaylord Nelson, incumbent U.S. Senator since 1963

Republican
Jerris Leonard, State Senator

Results

See also 
 United States Senate elections, 1968

References
 http://www.ourcampaigns.com

1968
United States Senate
Wisconsin